This is a list of the Spanish PROMUSICAE Top 20 Singles number-ones of 1995.

Records for the Year
 Longest running number one of the year - Ororo "Zombie" (9 non-consecutive weeks)
 Artists with most number ones - Take That and Scatman John (2)

See also
1995 in music
List of number-one hits (Spain)

References

1995
Spain Singles
Number-one singles